Helsinki Airport station is a Helsinki commuter rail station located at Helsinki Airport in Vantaa, Finland.

Helsinki Airport station is on the Ring Rail Line, located between the stations of Aviapolis and Leinelä. It is the world's northernmost underground railway station.

History 
Although the Ring Rail Line opened on 1 July 2015, the airport railway station opened only on 10 July 2015, and only the Tietotie exit was accessible at this time. Because the exit was the one farther away from the terminal, a temporary shuttle bus was operated until the elevators for the passenger terminal-side exit were completed in December 2015. The escalators for the terminal-side exit were finally brought into use on 17 March 2016.

Future proposals
As part of ongoing plans for high-speed rail in Finland, Helsinki Airport station would be linked to Helsinki Central via a direct tunnel (a project known as Lentorata), surfacing at Kerava and continuing to Tampere Central, at an estimated cost of €5.5 billion.

Proposals exist to connect Kouvola railway station to Helsinki via a new 106 km line, Itärata (Eastrail), through Porvoo and Helsinki Airport station.

References

External links 
 

Railway stations in Vantaa
Railway stations opened in 2015
2015 establishments in Finland
Airport railway stations
Railway stations located underground